The Church of St Mary, Lastingham, is the Anglican parish church for the village of Lastingham in North Yorkshire, England.

The first church on the site was a Catholic monastery founded in 654, though the present church dates from the latter part of the 11th century and was converted to an Anglican church during the Reformation. Lastingham has been an important part of Christian heritage and culture in Northern England and as such, has been a place of pilgrimage, especially for its rare crypt, which is said to be unique architecturally for England, and possibly, the world.

History
The Venerable Bede described how in 654, monks established a wooden monastery at Lastingeau, which in Bede's time (730) meant the abode of Læ̃sta's people. The land for the monastery was procured from the King of Deira and the monks established their house in "a fold of the Yorkshire Moors". St Cedd was the first abbot and he died of the plague at Lastingham in 664. At first he was buried in the open air, but the monks eventually built a church around him. This church has no substantial structures left; it is thought that the church was destroyed during the various raids in the area over the next 400 years, particularly by Danish invaders. 

When Cedd died, his brother St Chad, took over as abbot and running of the monastery, but not long afterwards, he moved to Lichfield. Eventually, the relics and remnants of St Cedd's presence at Lastingham were removed and kept with those of his brother in Lichfield. Some of their bones are now entombed in Birmingham's Catholic Cathedral though St Cedd is believed to be mostly buried at Lastingham.

The monastery is believed to have been destroyed in 870, but William the Conqueror gave permission for a new church to be built on the site in 1078, when a cohort of Benedictine monks from Whitby, set up the new church under Stephen. However, they only stayed for ten years before moving on to York; it was reasoned later that the remoteness of the abbey and the outlaw nature of the area forced them to relocate. The revival of the church has therefore been confined to a clear decade and the Romanesque architecture is prominent in the reconstructed church. Some have pointed out the rarity in being able to see a start and end date in the building of the church.

The church, originally Catholic, came under Anglican jurisdiction following the dissolution of the monasteries during the Reformation.

Architectural development 
During the 13th century, arcades, bays and aisle in the north and south parts of the church were added. In the following century, the tower was erected and it was left for five centuries with little further work until 1879, when it was renovated by John Loughborough Pearson with the porch being rebuilt and the whole church being re-roofed. This has led to a mix of architectural styles; the walls of the aisles are Perpendicular, but the nave (and indeed, most of the foundations and crypt) are Norman. Glynne was quite critical of the restoration, but Pevsner wrote favourably about it describing Pearson's efforts as "remarkably sympathetic". Stone altars in the church have been dated back to Roman times with current thinking being that they were re-worked during the Anglo-Saxon period.

It is reputed to be the only crypt in England that has a nave, apse and side aisles. The crypt also lays claim to be the oldest Norman crypt in the world and additionally the only one with a nave, aisles and an apsidal chancel. The crypt runs underneath the whole footprint of the church above and is furnished with one square shaft which is indented with a piscina. The crypt is supported by four pillars believed to be of pre-conquest in origin and historians estimate that the crypt has not been altered since the time of William the Conqueror. The crypt is accessed by a staircase descending from nave. During the 18th century, cock-fighting was said to have taken place in the crypt, with or without the knowledge of the clergy and churchwarden.

The architecture of the church in conjunction with its history, means that it regularly features on the best of lists for Anglican churches in England. Pevsner described the crypt as "unforgettable"; John Betjeman concurred describing St Mary's as "one of the most moving places in England". Simon Jenkins is equally effusive in his book, England's Thousand Best Churches, awarding the church four stars out of a possible five and stating that while "most churches are a challenge to the faithful, Lastingham is a challenge to the faithless." Jenkins notes the rarity of the crypt but also points out that the church lacks monuments and historical artefacts:

The parish and benefice
The church has been the parish church for Lastingham since at least 1228, although the church was given to St Mary's in York until 1299 and its first vicar is not listed until 1314.

The benefice of Lastingham includes four parishes with five churches; Christ Church Appleton-le-Moors, St Gregory Cropton, St Chad Hutton-le-Hole, St Mary Lastingham and St Mary & St Lawrence in Rosedale Abbey.

Notes

References

Sources

External links

Friends of Lastingham Church

Church of England church buildings in North Yorkshire
Grade I listed churches in North Yorkshire
11th-century church buildings in England
Ryedale